MAN Lion's refers to various bus series by MAN.
MAN Lion's Chassis
MAN Lion's City
MAN Lion's Intercity, a bus used by TPER in Italy
MAN Lion's Coach